Sambice was a late 5th-century Iranian noblewoman from the Sasanian dynasty, who was the sister-wife of king (shah) Kavad I and mother of his first son, Kawus. Perhaps she can be associated with the wife (or sister) of Kavad I who helped him escape from captivity in the Castle of Oblivion in 496.

References

Sources 
 

5th-century Iranian people
Sasanian queens
Kavad I
Sasanian princesses
5th-century women